Idaho is a 1925 American silent Western film serial directed by Robert F. Hill. The film is considered to be lost.

Cast

Chapter titles
 Road Agents 
 Hands Up
 The Stampede
 Forbidden Testimony
 Lawless Laws
 Aroused
 The Trap
 The White Streak
 Unmasked
 Vigilantes

See also
 List of film serials
 List of film serials by studio
 List of lost films

References

External links

 
 Still at lostmediawiki.com

1925 films
1925 Western (genre) films
1925 lost films
American silent serial films
American black-and-white films
Films directed by Robert F. Hill
Lost Western (genre) films
Lost American films
Pathé Exchange film serials
Silent American Western (genre) films
1920s American films